Dejan Manaskov (born 26 August 1992) is a Macedonian handball player for RK Vardar 1961 and the Macedonian national team. 

He is the older son of Pepi Manaskov. 
His brother, Martin Manaskov, is also a handball player.

With Metalurg he won the championship and the cup 4 times. 
After Metalurg he moved to the prominent Bundesliga Wetzlar. He had a great season with Wetzlar.
So next season RK Vardar brought the winger sniper in its superstar team . He had great seson in Vardar winning both the cup and the championship and German Rhein-Necker immediately showed interest in bringing the winger sniper in Germany. 
After winning the German Bundesliga in his first season European Heavy Weight Veszprem decided to bring him at his team.
Having many successful years with Veszprem in the season 2022 he get back to Skopje and signed with RK Vardar again.

Honours
RK Metalurg
 Macedonian Handball Super League
 Winner: (2009–10, 2010–11, 2011–12 and 2013–14)
 Macedonian Cup
 Winner: (2009, 2010, 2011 and 2013)
RK Vardar
 Macedonian Handball Super League
 Winner: (2015–16)
Macedonian Cup
 Winner:(2016)
Rhein-Neckar Löwen
German League: 2017
Veszprem 
 Hungarian league : 2018-19
 Hungarian Cup: 2018, 2021, 2022

References

External links

1992 births
Living people
Macedonian male handball players
Handball-Bundesliga players
Expatriate handball players
Macedonian expatriate sportspeople in Germany
Macedonian expatriate sportspeople in Hungary
Veszprém KC players
Rhein-Neckar Löwen players
HSG Wetzlar players
RK Vardar players
Sportspeople from Créteil